Richard Wayne Van Dyke (born December 13, 1925) is an American actor, entertainer, and comedian. His award-winning career has spanned seven decades in film, television, and stage. Van Dyke is the recipient of multiple awards, including a Golden Globe, Tony, Grammy, a Daytime Emmy, and four Primetime Emmys. He was inducted into the Television Hall of Fame in 1995 and the Hollywood Walk of Fame in 2012. He was honored with the Screen Actors Guild Life Achievement Award in 2013, the Kennedy Center Honors in 2021 and was recognized as a Disney Legend. 

Van Dyke began his career as an entertainer on radio and television, in nightclubs, and on the Broadway stage. In 1961, he starred in the original production of Bye Bye Birdie, a role which earned him the Tony Award for Best Featured Actor in a Musical. Carl Reiner then cast him as Rob Petrie on the CBS television sitcom The Dick Van Dyke Show from 1961 to 1966, which made him a household name. He went on to star in the movie musicals Bye Bye Birdie (1963), Mary Poppins (1964), and Chitty Chitty Bang Bang (1968), and in the comedy-drama The Comic (1969). 

He made guest appearances on television programs Columbo (1974) and The Carol Burnett Show (1977), and starred in The New Dick Van Dyke Show (1971–74), Diagnosis: Murder (1993–2001), and Murder 101 (2006–08). Van Dyke has also made appearances in the films Dick Tracy (1990), Curious George (2006), Night at the Museum (2006), Night at the Museum: Secret of the Tomb (2014), and Mary Poppins Returns (2018).

Early life and education
Van Dyke was born on December 13, 1925, in West Plains, Missouri, to Hazel Victoria (née McCord; 1896–1992), a stenographer, and Loren Wayne "Cookie" Van Dyke (1898–1976), a salesman. He grew up in Danville, Illinois. He is the older brother of actor Jerry Van Dyke (1931–2018), who appeared as his brother in The Dick Van Dyke Show. Van Dyke is a Dutch surname, although he also has English, Irish, and Scottish ancestry. His family line traces back to Mayflower passenger John Alden.

Van Dyke is member of the class of 1944 of Danville High School, where he participated in the a cappella choir and dramatic club. His involvement in the drama program convinced him to become a professional entertainer, although he also considered a career in the ministry. Van Dyke left high school during his senior year to join the United States Army Air Forces for pilot training during World War II. Denied enlistment several times for being underweight, he was eventually accepted for service as a radio announcer before transferring to the Special Services and entertaining troops in the continental United States. He was discharged in 1946. Van Dyke received his high school diploma in 2004.

Career

Radio and stage

During the late 1940s, Van Dyke was a radio DJ on WDAN in Danville, Illinois. In 1947, Van Dyke was persuaded by pantomime performer Phil Erickson to form a comedy duo called "Eric and Van—the Merry Mutes." The team toured the West Coast nightclub circuit, performing a mime act and lip synching to 78 records. They moved to Atlanta, Georgia, in the early 1950s and performed a local television show featuring original skits and music called "The Merry Mutes".

In November 1959, Van Dyke made his Broadway debut in The Girls Against the Boys. He played the lead role of Albert Peterson in Bye Bye Birdie, which ran from April 14, 1960, to October 7, 1961. The musical won four Tony awards including Van Dyke's Best Featured Actor Tony, in 1961. In 1980, Van Dyke appeared in the title role in the first Broadway revival of The Music Man.

Television
Van Dyke's start in television was with WDSU-TV New Orleans Channel 6 (NBC), first as a single comedian and later as emcee of a comedy program. Van Dyke's first network TV appearance was with Dennis James on James' Chance of a Lifetime in 1954. He later appeared in two episodes of The Phil Silvers Show during its 1957–58 season. He also appeared early in his career on ABC's The Pat Boone Chevy Showroom and NBC's The Polly Bergen Show. During this time a friend from the Army was working as an executive for CBS television and recommended Van Dyke to that network. Out of this came a seven-year contract with the network. During an interview on NPR's Wait Wait... Don't Tell Me! program, Van Dyke said he was the anchorman for the CBS Morning Show during this period with Walter Cronkite as his newsman.

From 1961 to 1966, Van Dyke starred in the CBS sitcom The Dick Van Dyke Show, in which he portrayed a comedy writer named Rob Petrie. Carl Reiner conceived the program and cast himself as the lead in the pilot, but CBS insisted on recasting, and Reiner chose Van Dyke to replace him in the role. Complementing Van Dyke was a veteran cast of comic actors including Rose Marie, Morey Amsterdam, Jerry Paris, Ann Morgan Guilbert, Richard Deacon, and Carl Reiner (as Alan Brady), as well as 24-year-old Mary Tyler Moore, who played Rob's wife Laura Petrie. Van Dyke won three Emmy Awards as Outstanding Lead Actor in a Comedy Series, and the series received four Emmy Awards as Outstanding Comedy Series.

From 1971 to 1974, Van Dyke starred in an unrelated sitcom called The New Dick Van Dyke Show in which he portrayed a local television talk show host. Although the series was developed by Carl Reiner and starred Hope Lange as his wife, and he received a Golden Globe nomination for his performance, the show was less successful than its predecessor, and Van Dyke pulled the plug on the show after just three seasons. In 1973, Van Dyke voiced his animated likeness for the October 27, 1973, installment of Hanna-Barbera's The New Scooby-Doo Movies, "Scooby-Doo Meets Dick Van Dyke," the series' final first-run episode. The following year, he received an Emmy Award nomination for his role as an alcoholic businessman in the television movie The Morning After (1974). Van Dyke revealed after its release that he had recently overcome a real-life drinking problem. He admits he was an alcoholic for 25 years. That same year he guest-starred as a murderous photographer on an episode of Columbo, Negative Reaction. Van Dyke returned to comedy in 1976 with the sketch comedy show Van Dyke and Company, on which Andy Kaufman made his prime time debut. Despite being canceled after three months, the show won an Emmy Award for Outstanding Comedy-Variety Series. After a few guest appearances on the long-running comedy-variety series The Carol Burnett Show, Van Dyke became a regular on the show, in the fall of 1977. However, he appeared in only half of the episodes of the final season. For the next decade he appeared mostly in TV movies. One atypical role was as a murdering judge on the second episode of the TV series Matlock in 1986 starring Andy Griffith. In 1987, he guest-starred in an episode of Airwolf, with his son Barry Van Dyke, who was the lead star of the show's fourth and final season on USA Network. In 1989, he guest-starred on the NBC comedy series The Golden Girls portraying a lover of Beatrice Arthur's character. This role earned him his first Emmy Award nomination since 1977.

Van Dyke's film work affected his TV career: the reviews he received for his role as D.A. Fletcher in Dick Tracy led him to star as the character Dr. Mark Sloan first in an episode of Jake and the Fatman, then in a series of TV movies on CBS that became the foundation for his popular television drama Diagnosis: Murder. The series ran from 1993 to 2001 with son Barry Van Dyke co-starring in the role of Dr. Sloan's son Lieutenant Detective Steve Sloan. Also starring on the same show was daytime soap actress Victoria Rowell as Dr. Sloan's pathologist/medical partner, Dr. Amanda Bentley, and Charlie Schlatter in the role of Dr. Sloan's student, Dr. Jesse Travis. Van Dyke continued to find television work after the show ended, including a dramatically and critically successful performance of The Gin Game, produced for television in 2003 that reunited him with Mary Tyler Moore. In 2003, he portrayed a doctor on Scrubs. A 2004 special of The Dick Van Dyke Show titled The Dick Van Dyke Show Revisited was heavily promoted as the first new episode of the classic series to be shown in 38 years. Van Dyke and his surviving cast members recreated their roles; although nominated for a Primetime Emmy, the program was roundly panned by critics. In 2006 he guest-starred as college professor Dr. Jonathan Maxwell for a series of Murder 101 mystery films on the Hallmark Channel.

For the Marvel Cinematic Universe television series, WandaVision, Van Dyke was consulted by the producers on how to emulate The Dick Van Dyke Show.

In 2023, Van Dyke was a contestant on the season nine premiere of The Masked Singer and was the first to be eliminated. The episode had been promoted as "the most legendary, decorated and beloved unmasking in history". After Van Dyke revealed his identity, he received a lengthy standing ovation from the audience and judges. Before departing the stage, Van Dyke sang a portion of "Supercalifragilisticexpialidocious" from Mary Poppins, in which he starred. At age 97, Van Dyke became the oldest person ever to compete on the series.

Film
Van Dyke began his film career by playing the role of Albert J. Peterson in the film version of Bye Bye Birdie (1963). Despite his unhappiness with the adaptation—its focus differed from the stage version in that the story now centered on a previously supporting character—the film was a success. That same year, Van Dyke was cast in two roles: as Bert, a man who goes through multiple odd jobs, ultimately and memorably becoming a chimney sweep; and as bank chairman Mr. Dawes Senior, in Walt Disney's Mary Poppins (1964). For his scenes as the chairman, he was heavily costumed to look much older and was credited in that role as "Navckid Keyd" (at the end of the credits, the letters unscramble into "Dick Van Dyke," which was repeated in Mary Poppins Returns). Van Dyke's attempt at a cockney accent has been lambasted as one of the worst accents in film history, cited by actors since as an example of how not to sound. In a 2003 poll by Empire magazine of the worst-ever accents in film, he came in second (to Sean Connery in The Untouchables, despite Connery winning an Academy Award for that performance). According to Van Dyke, his accent coach was Irish, who "didn't do an accent any better than I did", and that no one alerted him to how bad it was during the production. Still, Mary Poppins was successful on release and its appeal has endured. "Chim Chim Cher-ee", one of the songs that Van Dyke performed in Mary Poppins, won the Academy Award for Best Original Song for the Sherman Brothers, the film's songwriting duo.

Many of the comedy films Van Dyke starred in throughout the 1960s were relatively unsuccessful at the box office, including What a Way to Go! with Shirley MacLaine, Lt. Robin Crusoe, U.S.N., Fitzwilly, The Art of Love with James Garner and Elke Sommer, Some Kind of a Nut, Never a Dull Moment with Edward G. Robinson, and Divorce American Style with Debbie Reynolds and Jean Simmons. But he also starred as Caractacus Potts (with his native accent, at his own insistence, despite the English setting) in the successful musical version of Ian Fleming's Chitty Chitty Bang Bang (1968), which co-starred Sally Ann Howes and featured the same songwriters (The Sherman Brothers) and choreographers (Marc Breaux and Dee Dee Wood) as Mary Poppins.

In 1969, Van Dyke appeared in the comedy-drama The Comic, written and directed by Carl Reiner. Van Dyke portrayed a self-destructive silent film era comedian who struggles with alcoholism, depression, and his own rampant ego. Reiner wrote the film especially for Van Dyke, who often spoke of his admiration for silent film era comedians such as Charlie Chaplin and his hero Stan Laurel. Also in 1969, Van Dyke played Rev. Clayton Brooks, a small-town minister who leads his Iowa town to quit smoking for 30 days to win $25 million (equal to $ today) from a tobacco company in Cold Turkey, although that film was not released until 1971.

On Larry King Live, Van Dyke mentioned that he turned down the lead role in The Omen which was played by Gregory Peck. He also mentioned that his dream role would have been the Scarecrow in The Wizard of Oz. Twenty-one years later in 1990, Van Dyke, whose usual role had been the amiable hero, took a small but villainous turn as crooked DA Fletcher in Warren Beatty's film Dick Tracy. Van Dyke returned to motion pictures in 2006 with Curious George as Mr. Bloomsberry and as villain Cecil Fredericks in the Ben Stiller film Night at the Museum. He reprised the role in a cameo for the sequel, Night at the Museum: Battle of the Smithsonian (2009), but it was cut from the film. It can be found in the special features on the DVD release. He also played the character again in the third film, Night at the Museum: Secret of the Tomb (2014).

In 2018, Van Dyke portrayed Mr. Dawes Jr. in Mary Poppins Returns. He had previously portrayed both Bert and Mr. Dawes, Sr. (Mr. Dawes, Jr.'s late father), in the original film.

Other projects

Van Dyke received a Grammy Award in 1964, along with Julie Andrews, for his performance on the soundtrack to Mary Poppins. In 1970, he published Faith, Hope and Hilarity: A Child's Eye View of Religion a book of humorous anecdotes based largely on his experiences as a Sunday School teacher. Van Dyke was principal in "KXIV Inc." and owned 1400 AM KXIV in Phoenix from 1965 to 1982.

As an a cappella enthusiast, Van Dyke has sung in a group called "Dick Van Dyke and The Vantastix" since September 2000. The quartet has performed several times in Los Angeles as well as on Larry King Live, The First Annual TV Land Awards, and sang the national anthem at three Los Angeles Lakers games including a nationally televised NBA Finals performance on NBC. Van Dyke was made an honorary member of the Barbershop Harmony Society in 1999.

Van Dyke became a computer animation enthusiast after purchasing an Amiga in 1991. He is credited with the creation of 3D-rendered effects used on Diagnosis: Murder and The Dick Van Dyke Show Revisited. Van Dyke has displayed his computer-generated imagery work at SIGGRAPH, and continues to work with LightWave 3D.

In 2010, Van Dyke appeared on a children's album titled Rhythm Train, with Red Hot Chili Peppers drummer Chad Smith and singer Leslie Bixler. Van Dyke raps on one of the album's tracks.

In 2017, Van Dyke released his first solo album since 1963's Songs I Like. The album, Step (Back) In Time, was produced by Bill Bixler (who also played sax), with arrangements by Dave Enos (who also played bass) and features noted musicians John Ferraro (drums), Tony Guerrero (trumpet & vocal duet), Mark LeBrun (piano), Charley Pollard (trombone) and Leslie Bixler (vocals). Step (Back) In Time was released by BixMix Records and showcases Van Dyke in a jazz and big band setting on classic songs from the 1920s, 1930s and 1940s.

Van Dyke recorded a duet single for Christmas 2017 with actress Jane Lynch. The song, "We're Going Caroling," was written and produced by Tony Guerrero for Lynch's KitschTone Records label as a digital-only release.

Influences
Van Dyke has often cited Stan Laurel, Buster Keaton, and Carl Reiner as his comedy influences and idols. Van Dyke stated on Conan that he called Laurel and admitted to him that he had stolen from him over the years, and Laurel replied, "Yes, I know". Entertainers who have cited Van Dyke as an influence include Steve Martin, Chevy Chase, Conan O'Brien, Jim Carrey, and Bryan Cranston.

Personal life

On February 12, 1948, while appearing at the Chapman Park Hotel on Wilshire Boulevard in Los Angeles, he and the former Margerie Willett were married on the radio show Bride and Groom. They had four children: Christian, Barry, Stacy and Carrie Beth. They divorced in 1984 after a long separation. In 1976, Van Dyke began his relationship with longtime companion Michelle Triola Marvin. They lived together for more than 30 years, until her death in 2009. On February 29, 2012, at the age of 86, Van Dyke married 40-year-old make-up artist Arlene Silver. They had met six years earlier at the SAG awards.

Van Dyke incorporated his children and grandchildren into his TV endeavors. Son Barry Van Dyke, grandsons Shane Van Dyke and Carey Van Dyke along with other Van Dyke grandchildren and relatives appeared in various episodes of the long-running series Diagnosis: Murder. Although Stacy Van Dyke was not well known in show business, she made an appearance in the Diagnosis: Murder Christmas episode "Murder in the Family" (season 4) as Carol Sloan Hilton, the estranged daughter of Dr. Mark Sloan. All of Van Dyke's children are married, and he has seven grandchildren. His son Chris was district attorney for Marion County, Oregon, in the 1980s. In 1987, Van Dyke's granddaughter Jessica Van Dyke died from Reye syndrome, which led him to do a series of commercials to raise public awareness of the danger of aspirin to children.

Throughout his acting career he continued to teach Sunday school in the Presbyterian Church where he was an elder, and he continued to read such theologians as Martin Buber, Paul Tillich, and Dietrich Bonhoeffer.

On August 19, 2013, it was reported that the 87-year-old Van Dyke was rescued from his Jaguar by a passerby after the car had caught fire on the US 101 freeway in Calabasas, Los Angeles County. He was not injured in the fire, although the car burned down to its frame.

Van Dyke endorsed Bernie Sanders in the 2016 Democratic Party presidential primaries. In July 2016, while campaigning for Sanders, Van Dyke said of Donald Trump, "I haven't been this scared since the Cuban Missile Crisis. I think the human race is hanging in a delicate balance right now, and I'm just so afraid he will put us in a war. He scares me." Van Dyke again endorsed and campaigned for Sanders in the 2020 Democratic Party presidential primaries.

Health
Van Dyke is sober after struggling with alcoholism for years, and he checked in to a hospital for three weeks in 1972 to be treated for his addiction. Van Dyke was a heavy smoker for most of his adult life. In a January 2013 interview with the London Daily Telegraph, he said he had been using Nicorette gum for the past decade. In April 2013, Van Dyke revealed that for seven years he had been experiencing symptoms of a neurological disorder, in which he felt a pounding in his head whenever he lay down, but despite his undergoing tests, no diagnosis had been made. He had to cancel scheduled appearances owing to fatigue from lack of sleep because of the medical condition. In May 2013, he tweeted that it seemed his titanium dental implants may be responsible.

Acting credits

Awards and honors

Van Dyke has received various awards, including a Grammy Award, four Primetime Emmy Awards, and a Tony Award. In 1961 he won the Tony Award for Best Featured Actor in a Musical for his performance in Bye Bye Birdie. In 1964 he won a Grammy Award for Best Children's Album for Mary Poppins. Nominated for 10 Primetime Emmy Awards, Van Dyke received four awards for his work on The Dick Van Dyke Show and Van Dyke and Company.

In 2013, Van Dyke received the Screen Actors Guild Life Achievement Award. In 2021, he was honored with the Kennedy Center Honors, where he was given tribute by Julie Andrews, Steve Martin, Chita Rivera, Bryan Cranston and Lin-Manuel Miranda. Laura Osnes sang "Jolly Holiday", and Derek Hough performed "Step in Time" both from Mary Poppins (1964). Together Hough and Osnes performed "Put on a Happy Face" from Bye Bye Birdie. Aaron Tveit sang "Chitty Chitty Bang Bang" with Pentatonix.

Writing
 
 
 
  (Van Dyke's memoir)

See also 
 List of members of the American Legion
 List of people from Missouri

References

External links

 
 
 
 
 Dick Van Dyke – Disney Legends profile (requires Flash)
 Dick Van Dyke talks about his career for the Archive of American Television Arts and Sciences (requires Flash)
 Empire – The Worst British Accents Ever – Number 11 – Dick Van Dyke singing in Mary Poppins (1964) (requires Flash)

 
1925 births
Living people
20th-century American male actors
20th-century American male singers
20th-century American singers
20th-century American comedians
21st-century American comedians
21st-century American male actors
21st-century American male singers
21st-century American singers
21st-century American memoirists
21st-century Presbyterians
American baritones
American male comedians
American male dancers
American male film actors
American male musical theatre actors
American male television actors
American male voice actors
American male non-fiction writers
American people of Dutch descent
American people of English descent
American people of Irish descent
American people of Scottish descent
American Presbyterians
American sketch comedians
Barbershop Harmony Society
California Democrats
Daytime Emmy Award winners
Grammy Award winners
Hanna-Barbera people
Jamie Records artists
Male actors from Illinois
Male actors from Los Angeles County, California
Male actors from Missouri
Military personnel from Illinois
Musicians from Los Angeles County, California
Outstanding Performance by a Lead Actor in a Comedy Series Primetime Emmy Award winners
People from Danville, Illinois
People from West Plains, Missouri
Screen Actors Guild Life Achievement Award
Singers from California
Singers from Illinois
Singers from Missouri
Television producers from California
Television producers from Illinois
Television producers from New York City
Tony Award winners
United States Army Air Forces non-commissioned officers
United States Army Air Forces personnel of World War II
Dick
Writers from California
Writers from Illinois
Writers from Missouri
Television producers from Missouri
Kennedy Center honorees